Jovan Beader (born June 12, 1970) is a Serbian professional basketball coach who is an assistant coach for Lokomotiv Kuban of the VTB United League.

Coaching career 
Beader was an assistant for Nizhny Novgorod (Russia) and Banvit (Turkey) while the head coach was Zoran Lukić.

On May 8, 2017, Beader was named as a head coach for Sloveanian team Helios Suns. On November 12, 2018, he was sacked due to bad results.

In February 2021, he became an assistant coach of Lokomotiv Kuban under Evgeniy Pashutin.

References

External links 
 Profile at eurobasket.com

1970 births
Living people
Serbian expatriate basketball people in Kuwait
Serbian expatriate basketball people in Russia
Serbian expatriate basketball people in Slovenia
Serbian expatriate basketball people in Turkey
Serbian men's basketball coaches
Sportspeople from Belgrade
KK Koper Primorska coaches
Helios Suns players
KK Helios Domžale coaches